Delhi Metropolitan Council election, 1972 was held in Indian National Capital Territory of Delhi to elect 56 councillors to the Delhi Metropolitan Council. This council had no legislative powers, but only an advisory role in administration of the territory.

Results

!colspan=10|
|- align=center
!colspan=2|Party
!Candidates
!Seats won
!Votes
!Vote%
|-
| 
|align="left"|Indian National Congress||52||44||681,324||48.54%
|-
| 
|align="left"|Bharatiya Jana Sangh||56||5||540,069||38.47%
|-
| 
|align="left"|Communist Party of India||4||3||54,183||3.86%
|-
| 
|align="left"|Congress (O)||19||2||27,540||1.96%
|-
| 
|align="left"|Independent||104||2||78,208||5.57%
|-
!colspan=2| Total !! - !! 56 !! - !! -
|-
|}

Elected members

Executive Council members

References

Delhi
Elections in Delhi
Local elections in Delhi
Autonomous district council elections in India
1970s in Delhi